Events from the year 1963 in art.

Events
 January 8 – Leonardo da Vinci's Mona Lisa is exhibited in the United States for the first (and only) time, for a period of four weeks, at the National Gallery of Art in Washington, D.C. During this time it was viewed by over half a million people.
 September – The David Mirvish Gallery is opened in Toronto by David Mirvish.
 November 17 – Museo Bodoniano opens in Parma, Italy.
 Museum of Contemporary Art (Skopje) opens in Yugoslavia.
 First Pirelli Calendar (for 1964), photographed by Robert Freeman in Majorca, issued in the United Kingdom. His portrait of The Beatles is used on the cover of their album With the Beatles (released November 22).

Awards
 Archibald Prize: J Carington Smith – Professor James McAuley
 John Moores Painting Prize – Roger Hilton for "March 1963"

Exhibitions
 Visione e Colore, Palazzo Grassi, Venice
 Roy Lichtenstein's second solo exhibition, Leo Castelli Gallery, New York City
 Morris Louis memorial exhibition, Guggenheim Museum, New York City

Works

 Josef Albers – "Manhattan" for the Pan Am Building in New York City (disassembled and removed in 2000 - recreated from Albers' design specifications in 2019 after the original was determined to be unsalvageable due to asbestos)
 Liberty Bell (Portland, Oregon)
 Georg Baselitz – Die große Nacht im Eimer (Museum Ludwig, Cologne)
 Romare Bearden – Prevalence of Ritual
 Maurice Boitel – Cadaques
 M. C. Escher – Möbius Strip II (Red Ants) (woodcut)
 David Hockney – Domestic Scene, Los Angeles 
 Edward Hopper – Two Comedians
 Roy Lichtenstein
 Bratatat!
 Crying Girl (lithograph)
 Drowning Girl
 Hopeless
 In the Car
 Okay Hot-Shot, Okay!
 Torpedo...Los!
 Varoom! 
 Whaam! (diptych)
 Woman with Flowered Hat
 René Magritte – The Difficult Crossing (2nd version)
 Lewis Morley – Christine Keeler (photograph)
 John Piper and Patrick Reyntiens – windows at St Andrew's Church, Plymouth
 Andy Warhol
 Death in America (screenprint series)
 Eight Elvises
 Green Car Crash (Green Burning Car I)
 Orange Disaster #5
 Red Car Crash
 Silver Car Crash (Double Disaster)
 Suicide (Purple Jumping Man)
 Thirty Are Better Than One
 White Disaster (White Car Crash 19 Times)
 David Wynne
 Christ and Mary Magdalene (bronze castings, Ely Cathedral and Magdalen College, Oxford)
 Fire Figure (partly gilded aluminium, Lewis's, Hanley, Staffordshire)
 Reclining Woman (bronzes)
 The Sisters (bronzes)
 Sleeping girl (bronzes)
 Yehudi Menuhin (bronze heads)

Births
 January 20 – Mark Ryden, American painter
 April 4 – Martin Firrell, French-born British public artist
 April 20 – Rachel Whiteread, English sculptor
 May 16 – Jon Coffelt, American painter, sculptor and book artist
 May 31 – Wesley Willis, American artist and musician (d. 2003)
 June 24 – Mike Wieringo, American comic book artist (d. 2007)
 July 20 – Ciruelo Cabral, Argentine fantasy artist
 August 16 – Stevenson Magloire, painter of the School of Saint Soleil (d. 1994)
 October 6 - Romero Britto, Brazilian artist
 date unknown
 Marco Evaristti, Chilean sculptor
 Anya Gallaccio, British installation artist
 Sophie Ryder, English sculptor
 Bob and Roberta Smith (Patrick Brill), English slogan painter

Deaths
 February 3 – Piero Manzoni, Italian artist (b. 1933)
 February 8 – Fortunino Matania, Italian-born illustrator and war artist (b. 1881)
 February 14 – Hilda Vīka, Latvian painter (born 1897)
 February 27 – Vladimir Konashevich, Russian graphic artist (b. 1888).
 March 1 – Felice Casorati, Italian painter (b. 1883)
 June 9 – Jacques Villon, French Cubist painter and printmaker (b. 1875)
 June 20 – Manuel Benedito, Spanish painter (b. 1875)
 July 16 – Antonio Donghi, Italian painter (b. 1897)
 July 23 – Aleksandr Gerasimov, Soviet socialist realist painter (b. 1881)
 August 11 – Alois Arnegger, Austrian painter (b. 1879)
 August 16 – Joan Eardley, British painter (b. 1921)
 August 31 – Georges Braque, French painter and sculptor (b. 1882)
 September 11 – Suzanne Duchamp, French Dadaist painter and sister of Marcel Duchamp (b. 1889)
 September 19 – David Low, New Zealand-born editorial cartoonist (b. 1891)
 October 20 – Everett Warner, American impressionist painter and printmaker (b. 1877)

See also
 1963 in fine arts of the Soviet Union

References

 
Years of the 20th century in art
1960s in art